Kamal Khan is a character in the 1983 James Bond film Octopussy.

Kamal Khan may also refer to:
Kamal Khan (singer), Bollywood playback singer
Kamaal R. Khan, Indian film actor, film producer and writer

See also
 Kamal Khan Zadran, former Governor of Khowst Province
 Kamal Khan, Conductor and Pianist, Symphony and Opera  
 Kamal Khan Dam, a dam in Iran